Women Love Once is a 1931 American pre-Code drama film directed by Edward Goodman and written by Zoë Akins. The film stars Paul Lukas, Eleanor Boardman, Juliette Compton, Geoffrey Kerr, Judith Wood and Marilyn Knowlden. The film was released on July 4, 1931, by Paramount Pictures.

Cast
Paul Lukas as Julien Fields
Eleanor Boardman as Helen Fields
Juliette Compton as Hester Dahlgren
Geoffrey Kerr as Allen Greenough
Judith Wood as Olga
Marilyn Knowlden as Janet Fields
Claude King as Theodore Stewart
Mischa Auer as Oscar

References

External links 
 

1931 films
American drama films
1931 drama films
Paramount Pictures films
American black-and-white films
1930s English-language films
1930s American films